The James River (also known as the Jim River or the Dakota River) is a tributary of the Missouri River, approximately 710 miles (1,140 km) long, draining an area of 20,653 square miles (53,490 km2) in the U.S. states of North Dakota and South Dakota. About 70 percent of the drainage area is in South Dakota. The river provides the main drainage of the flat lowland area of the Dakotas between the two plateau regions known as the Missouri Coteau and the Coteau des Prairies. This narrow area was formed by the James lobe of the Laurentide Ice Sheet during the last ice age, and as a consequence the watershed of the river is slender and it has few major tributaries for a river of its length.

Reverse flow occurs when high inflow from tributaries leads to James River water flowing upstream for several miles above the joining water. This happens most frequently north of Huron, South Dakota.

The river arises in Wells County, North Dakota, approximately 10 mi (16 km) northwest of Fessenden. It flows briefly east towards New Rockford, then generally SSE through eastern North Dakota, past Jamestown, where it is first impounded by a large reservoir (the Jamestown Dam), and then joined by the Pipestem River. It enters northeastern South Dakota in Brown County, where it is impounded to form two reservoirs northeast of Aberdeen.

At Columbia, it is joined by the Elm River. Flowing southward across eastern South Dakota, it passes Huron and Mitchell, where it is joined by the Firesteel Creek. South of Mitchell, it flows southeast and joins the Missouri just east of Yankton.

The James River flows fully across the state of South Dakota, the only river other than the Missouri to do so.

River conditions during normal years include still water on both the James and its tributaries as well as flooding. Floods occur after snowmelt or heavy rains, as water easily breaches the James' low banks, and such floods tend to cover a significant portion of the floodplain. When the river is still, water quality drops.

History

Originally called E-ta-zi-po-ka-se Wakpa ("unnavigable river") in the Sioux language, the river was given the name Riviere aux Jacques in 1794 by Jean Trudeau, a French trader. This name was subsequently anglicized to James River, which was the name used by local whites at the time Dakota Territory was incorporated. However, the Dakota Territory Organic Act of 1861 renamed it the Dakota River. The new name failed to gain popular usage and the river retains its pre-1861 name.

Unrelated to the name of the river, the settlement of Jamestown, North Dakota was named by Thomas L. Rosser, a former Confederate general who helped to build the Northern Pacific Railroad across what became North Dakota, after the English colony of Jamestown in his native Virginia.

See also
 New Rockford Bridge
 List of longest rivers of the United States (by main stem)
 List of rivers of North Dakota
 List of rivers of South Dakota

References 

Rivers of North Dakota
Rivers of South Dakota
Tributaries of the Missouri River
Bodies of water of Wells County, North Dakota
Bodies of water of Eddy County, North Dakota
Bodies of water of Stutsman County, North Dakota
Rivers of Brown County, South Dakota
Rivers of Beadle County, South Dakota
Rivers of Davison County, South Dakota
Rivers of Yankton County, South Dakota
Rivers of Spink County, South Dakota